Cychropsis hungi is a species of ground beetle in the subfamily of Carabinae. It was described by Klienfeld in 2000.

References

hungi
Beetles described in 2000